Qasr Ibrahim (Ibrahim Palace) is a historical castle and fort that is located in the north of Alqoat neighborhood, Hofuf, Al-Ahsa, Eastern Province, Saudi Arabia. Besides, it is called the dome Palace, AlQoat Palace or Ibrahim Castle. Ibrahim palace is the main architectural heritage from the Ottoman period of Al-Hofuf that was a Turkish military barracks. After that, the palace was taken and seized by King Abdul-Aziz Al Saud in April 13, 1913 (5th of First Jumada 1331 AH).

The palace was constructed with a mosque that has a dome in 1555 (963 AH). During the next century, the palace was enlarged into a castle, prison and Turkish bath. In 2019, the Saudi Commission for Tourism and National Heritage has announced that the procedures of renovation of all parts of the palace have finished. This restoration process included rebuilding the fallen parts, painting the buildings and preparing a main square for the tourism activities and festivals.

History 
It was built in 1556 by Ali Ibn Ahmed Ibn Lawand Al-Burayki, the Ottoman governor of the time. The castle was renovated in 1801 by the Saudi governor Ibrahim Ibn ‘Ufaysan. Several historians believe that the castle was named after him.

Architecture 
It is considered as one of the major architectural masterpieces in Alhasa and it combines Islamic and military architecture.

The description of the palace 
Ibrahim Palace covers an area of 16500 square meters. Moreover, it is characterized by an architectural style that blends the Islamic and military features with the traditional architecture styles of Al-Ahsa region. Those styles are exhibited in the arcs, domes and ornamental designs.

The architecture styles of the palace consist of two features:

 Islamic style: This style can be seen in semi-circular arches, Islamic domes and the mihrab of the mosque. Regarding the minaret, it is made of stone and influenced from Turkish designs. It is a high minaret and has a spiral staircase.
 Military style: This is represented by the huge towers that surround the palace, and the residential soldiers barracks as well, which is located in the east of the palace and horse stables.

The construction of the palace was constructed based on local materials. While its walls were made of mud mixed with straw, the ceilings were made of palm trunks, sandalwood and stones.

The palace is square with a long fence and towers in the corners. The palace was provided with a group of observation windows, in which soldiers can look at the bottom of the fence.

UNESCO Site 
In 2018, Al-Ahsa Oasis became the fifth Saudi site to be registered on the UNESCO world heritage. Qasr Ibrahim Mosque was included as one of the 12 sites in the Cultural Landscape of Al-Ahsa Oasis.

References 

Forts in Saudi Arabia
Ottoman fortifications
Historic sites in Saudi Arabia
Tourist attractions in Saudi Arabia
Castles in Saudi Arabia